Helmut Horsch (born 12 October 1948) is a retired German striker and manager.

References

1948 births
Living people
German footballers
TuS Koblenz players
SG Wattenscheid 09 players
VfL Bochum II players
Association football forwards
2. Bundesliga players
German football managers
SC Preußen Münster managers
20th-century German people